Namib Mills Ltd, established in 1982, is the largest grain processing company in Namibia. It produces flour, pasta, animal feeds and other products from raw materials including maize, much of which is imported, and local varieties of pearl millet (mahangu).

Its main milling facility is located in the capital, Windhoek and it has two others in Otavi and Katima Mulilo. Namib Mills also operates collection centers on the country. It uses the brand name Meme Mahangu to market some products. Meme Mahangu lines include Meme Mahangu (pure), Meme Mahangu (oshikundu), Meme Mahangu (mixed) and Meme Mahangu (rice).

References
 Presidential speech

Food and drink companies of Namibia
Companies based in Windhoek
1982 establishments in South Africa
Food and drink companies established in 1982